Classical dance may refer to:
 Ballet, particularly classical ballet
 Indian classical dance
 Traditional forms of dancing in other cultures, such as Japanese traditional dance or Chinese traditional dance

See also 
 Ballroom dance